Six or Seven Times is a satyrical romantic jazz song written by Fats Waller and Irving Mills. The song was copyrighted in November, 1929. The song was first recorded by The Chocolate Dandies in September, 1929, for Okeh Records; their B-side was That's How I Feel Today. A month later, it was recorded by Duke Ellington and his Six Jolly Jesters, with vocals by Freddy Jenkins and Sonny Greer, for Brunswick/Vocalion.

Cab Calloway recorded a popular version for Brunswick on June 11, 1931.

References

1929 songs
Jazz songs
Songs with lyrics by Irving Mills
Cab Calloway songs
Duke Ellington songs
Songs with music by Fats Waller
Okeh Records singles